Jan-Derek Sørensen (born 28 December 1971) is a Norwegian former professional footballer, who played as a  right midfielder or right winger. He is currently the head coach in Bærum SK.

Club career
Sørensen was born in Oslo. His breakthrough came at Lyn, where he played 49 league matches from 1991 to 1994. He later played for Bodø/Glimt from 1994 to 1997 and Rosenborg from 1998 to 2000.

After a spell with German team Borussia Dortmund from January 2001 to January 2003 (winning the Bundesliga title in 2001–02 and reaching the final of the UEFA Cup in the same season), Sørensen returned to Lyn. In 2004 he became their top scorer, with nine goals. In November 2005 he signed a contract with Oslo rivals Vålerenga, something that did not sit well with the supporters of Lyn. He then played two years for Bodø/Glimt in 2008 and 2009 before retiring from professional football.

After some months of hiatus, in 2010 he signed for low-level team Bærumsløkka FK together with Axel Kolle and Glenn Hartmann.

International career
Sørensen earned 21 caps for Norway, between 1999 and 2004.

Honours
Borussia Dortmund
 UEFA Cup: Runner-up 2001–02
 Bundesliga: 2001–02

References

External links
 
 
 

1971 births
Living people
Association football midfielders
Norwegian footballers
Norway international footballers
Lyn Fotball players
Rosenborg BK players
Borussia Dortmund players
Vålerenga Fotball players
FK Bodø/Glimt players
Norwegian expatriate footballers
Bundesliga players
Expatriate footballers in Germany
Norwegian expatriate sportspeople in Germany
Eliteserien players
Footballers from Oslo